This article contains information about the literary events and publications of 1934.

Events
January 7 – The first Flash Gordon comic strip is created and illustrated by Alex Raymond and published in the United States.
January 25 – James Joyce's novel Ulysses, after a December acquittal (upheld on appeal in February) in United States v. One Book Called Ulysses, is first published in an authorized edition in the Anglophone world by Random House of New York City. It has 12,000 advance sales.
January – B. Traven's novel The Death Ship (1926) first appears in English.
February – Stefan Zweig flees Austria and settles in London.
February 6 – The February 6 riots in France, partly provoked by a performance of Shakespeare's Coriolanus by the Comédie-Française, will become the focus of a cult in the works of far-right authors, notably Death on Credit by Louis-Ferdinand Céline (1936) and Gilles by Pierre Drieu La Rochelle (1939). Also in 1934, Drieu announces his conversion to fascism, with the essay Socialisme fasciste.
March 16 and October 5 – P. G. Wodehouse's Thank You, Jeeves and Right Ho, Jeeves, the first full-length novels to feature Jeeves, are published.
April – F. Scott Fitzgerald's fourth and final completed novel, Tender Is the Night, appears in book form in New York, after serialization since January in the monthly Scribner's Magazine.
April 3 – The English literary biographer Thomas Wright (of Olney) first publishes, in the Daily Express, some facts about Charles Dickens' relations with the actress Ellen Ternan.
April 6 – Rudyard Kipling and W. B. Yeats are awarded the Gothenburg Prize for Poetry.
May 1 – The first officially designated Thingplatz for the performance of Thingspiele is dedicated in the Brandberge in Halle (Nazi Germany).
June
A medieval manuscript of Le Morte d'Arthur used by Caxton is identified in the Fellows' Library of Winchester College (England) by the bibliophile Walter Fraser Oakeshott.
The English poet Laurie Lee walks out one midsummer morning from his Gloucestershire home, bound for Spain.
Two notable gentleman detectives of the Golden Age of Detective Fiction, set in England, appear for the first time in print, later to have whole series written about them. The first to feature Inspector Roderick Alleyn of Scotland Yard is A Man Lay Dead by Ngaio Marsh, at this time resident in her native New Zealand, published in London. The first Sir Henry Merrivale locked room mystery, The Plague Court Murders, appears from John Dickson Carr, at this time resident in the UK and writing as "Carter Dickson", in New York around early June. It is followed in December by The White Priory Murders.
July 17 – The circular Manchester Central Library, England, opens.
August – Boris Pasternak and Korney Chukovsky are among those at the first Congress of the Union of Soviet Writers.
September – Henry Miller's novel Tropic of Cancer is published in Paris by the Obelisk Press. The United States Customs Service prohibits imports of it.
October 22 – A new Cambridge University Library, designed by Giles Gilbert Scott, opens in England.
October 24 – The first of Rex Stout's Nero Wolfe detective novels, Fer-de-Lance, is published in New York, and abridged in the November The American Magazine as "Point of Death."
November 20 – Lillian Hellman's first successful play, The Children's Hour, dealing with a theme of accusations of lesbianism, opens at the Maxine Elliott Theatre on Broadway in New York, where it will run for two years.
December 25 – The Romanian novelist Panait Istrati, a former communist, begins his collaboration with the quasi-fascist Cruciada Românismului with a polemic against antisemitism. The weekly newspaper, edited by Mihai Stelescu and Alexandru Talex, later hosts pieces by Constantin Virgil Gheorghiu.

Unknown date
The first three volumes of Mikhail Sholokhov's novel And Quiet Flows the Don first appear in English under this title.

New books

Fiction
M. Ageyev – Cocain Romance (Roman s kokainom)
Edwin Balmer and Philip Wylie – After Worlds Collide
Sharadindu Bandyopadhyay – Pother Kanta
Samuel Beckett – More Pricks Than Kicks
Phyllis Bottome – Private Worlds
 Marjorie Bowen – Moss Rose
Ernest Bramah – The Bravo of London
James Branch Cabell – Smirt
John Brophy – Waterfront
James M. Cain – The Postman Always Rings Twice
Morley Callaghan – Such Is My Beloved
Victor Canning – Mr. Finchley Discovers His England
Willy Corsari –  (Return to Thera, introduced Inspector Lund, the archetype Dutch detective)
John Dickson Carr
The Blind Barber
The Eight of Swords
The Bowstring Murders (as Carr Dickson/Carter Dickson)
The Plague Court Murders (as Carter Dickson)
The White Priory Murders (as Carter Dickson)
Devil Kinsmere (as Roger Fairbairn)
Gabriel Chevallier – Clochemerle
Agatha Christie
Murder on the Orient Express (book publication)
Why Didn't They Ask Evans? (full book publication)
The Listerdale Mystery (short stories)
Parker Pyne Investigates (short stories)
Unfinished Portrait (as Mary Westmacott)
Colette – Duo
Freeman Wills Crofts 
 The 12.30 from Croydon
 Mystery on Southampton Water
Henry de Montherlant – Les Célibataires (The Bachelors)
Isak Dinesen – Seven Gothic Tales
Pierre Drieu La Rochelle – The Comedy of Charleroi (La Comédie de Charleroi, linked short stories)
Max Ernst – Une semaine de bonté (A Week of Kindness, graphic novel)
F. Scott Fitzgerald – Tender Is the Night
Carlo Emilio Gadda – Il castello di Udine
Jeanne Galzy – Jeunes Filles en serre chaude (Young girls in a greenhouse)
 Anthony Gilbert – An Old Lady Dies
Jean Giono – The Song of the World
Robert Graves – I, Claudius
Graham Greene – It's a Battlefield
Walter Greenwood – His Worship the Mayor
Harold Heslop
The Crime of Peter Ropner
Goaf (English version)
Robert Hichens – The Power To Kill
James Hilton – Goodbye, Mr. Chips
Richard Hull – The Murder of My Aunt
Zora Neale Hurston – Jonah's Gourd Vine: A Novel
F. Tennyson Jesse – A Pin to See the Peepshow
D. Gwenallt Jones – Plasau'r Brenin
John Knittel – Via Mala
Halldór Laxness – Independent People (Sjálfstætt fólk) — Part I, Icelandic Pioneers (Landnámsmaður Íslands)
Alexander Lernet-Holenia – The Standard
Eric Linklater – Magnus Merriman
 E. C. R. Lorac
 Murder in Chelsea
 Murder in St. John's Wood
Marie Belloc Lowndes 
Another Man's Wife
The Chianti Flask
Compton Mackenzie – The Darkening Green
 Ngaio Marsh –  A Man Lay Dead
Alan Melville 
 Quick Curtain
 Weekend at Thrackley
Henry Miller – Tropic of Cancer
 Gladys Mitchell – Death at the Opera
Leopold Myers – Rajah Amar
Vladimir Nabokov – Despair
Carolina Nabuco – A Sucessora
John O'Hara – Appointment in Samarra
E. Phillips Oppenheim 
 The Spy Paramount
 The Strange Boarders of Palace Crescent
George Orwell – Burmese Days
John Cowper Powys
Autobiography
Weymouth Sands
Ellery Queen – The Chinese Orange Mystery
Henry Roth – Call It Sleep
Rafael Sabatini – Venetian Masque
Dorothy L. Sayers – The Nine Tailors
Bruno Schulz – The Street of Crocodiles (short stories, Sklepy cynamonowe – Cinnamon Shops – in December 1933, dated 1934)
Mihail Sebastian – De două mii de ani (For Two Thousand Years)
J. Slauerhoff – Het leven op aarde (Life on Earth)
Howard Spring – Shabby TigerIrving Stone – Lust for LifeRex Stout – Fer-de-LanceCecil Street 
 Poison for One The Robthorne Mystery Shot at DawnRuth Suckow – The FolksPhoebe Atwood TaylorThe Mystery of the Cape Cod Tavern Sandbar Sinister'Torquemada' – Cain's JawboneThomas F. Tweed – Blind MouthsS. S. Van DineThe Casino Murder CaseThe Dragon Murder CaseSimon Vestdijk – Terug tot Ina Damman (Return to Ina Damman, first published of the Anton Wachter cycle)
 Henry Wade – Constable Guard ThyselfEvelyn Waugh – A Handful of DustNathanael West – A Cool MillionDennis Wheatley – The Devil Rides OutDorothy Whipple – They Knew Mr. KnightP. G. WodehouseThank You, JeevesRight Ho, JeevesS. Fowler WrightDavidPrelude in Prague: The War of 1938Who Else But She? (as Sydney Fowler)
V. M. Yeates – Winged VictoryFrancis Brett Young – This Little WorldMarguerite Yourcenar – A Coin in Nine Hands (Denier du rêve)Children and young people
Edgar Rice Burroughs – Tarzan and the Lion ManElena Fortún – Celia en el mundo (Celia in the World)
Hergé – Cigars of the Pharaoh (Les Cigares du pharaon)Capt. W. E. Johns – Biggles of the Camel SquadronLorna Lewis – The Little French PoodleConstantin S. Nicolăescu-Plopșor – Paramiseà romanè (anthology)
Arthur Ransome – Coot ClubHilda van Stockum – A Day on SkatesWilliam Woodthorpe Tarn – The Treasure of the Isle of MistP. L. Travers – Mary Poppins (first in Mary Poppins series of eight books)
Geoffrey Trease – Bows Against the BaronsDrama
Tawfiq al-Hakim – Shahrazad (Scheherazade)
James Bridie – Mary Read
 Winifred Carter – The Queen Who Kept Her Head
Jean Cocteau – The Infernal Machine
Federico García Lorca – Yerma
 Ian Hay – Admirals All
Lillian Hellman – The Children's Hour
Frederick J. Jackson – The Bishop Misbehaves
Pär Lagerkvist – Bödeln (The Hangman; dramatization)
Eberhard Wolfgang Möller – Rothschild siegt bei Waterloo
Ayn Rand – Night of January 16th (first performed as Woman on Trial)
Lawrence Riley – Personal Appearance
Dodie Smith – Touch WoodJohn Van Druten – Flowers of the ForestPaul Vulpius (Ladislas Fodor and Hans Adler) – Youth at the HelmPoetry

Constantin S. Nicolăescu-Plopșor – Ghileà romanè (anthology)
Dylan Thomas – 18 PoemsNon-fiction
Ruth Benedict – Patterns of CultureMaud Bodkin – Archetypal Patterns of Poetry: Psychological Studies of ImaginationMarjorie Bowen – The Scandal of Sophie DawesMartí de Riquer i MoreraL'humanisme català (1388–1494)Humanisme i decadència en les lletres catalanesPierre Drieu La Rochelle – Socialisme fasciste (Fascist Socialism)
Daphne du Maurier – Gerald: A PortraitJulius Evola – Il Mistero del Graal e la Tradizione Ghibellina dell'Impero (The Mystery of the Grail)Emma Goldman – Living My LifeAldous Huxley – Beyond the Mexique BayNicolae IorgaByzance après ByzanceHistoire de la vie byzantineOrizonturile mele. O viață de om așa cum a fostHugh Kingsmill – The Sentimental Journey: A Life of Charles DickensCornelia Meigs – Invincible Louisa: The Story of the Author of Little WomenA. A. Milne – Peace with HonourPaul Otlet – Traité de DocumentationKarl Popper – The Logic of Scientific DiscoveryJ. B. Priestley – English JourneyAmber Reeves – The Nationalisation of BankingAntal Szerb – A magyar irodalom története (History of Hungarian literature)
H. G. Wells – An Experiment in AutobiographyBirths
January 4 – Hellmuth Karasek, German journalist, literary critic, and novelist (died 2015)
January 8 – Alexandra Ripley, American novelist (died 2004)
January 12 
 Ebrahim Nafae, Egyptian journalist (died 2018)
 Alan Sharp, Scottish-American screenwriter and author (died 2013)
January 18 – Raymond Briggs, English writer and illustrator (died 2022)
February 10
Fleur Adcock, New Zealand-born poet
Gordon Lish, American writer, editor and teacher
February 18 – Audre Lorde, American poet, writer and feminist (died 1992)
February 27 – N. Scott Momaday, Native American novelist
March 28 – Jean Louvet, Belgian dramatist (died 2015)
April 24 – Jayakanthan, Tamil writer, Jnanpith awardee (died 2015)
May 10 – Richard Peck, American novelist (died 2015)
May 12 – Elechi Amadi, Nigerian novelist (died 2016)
May 27 – Harlan Ellison, American science fiction writer (died 2018)
June 11 – Lady Annabel Goldsmith, English memoirist and socialite
July 11 – Helen Cresswell, English children's writer and scriptwriter (died 2005)
July 13 – Wole Soyinka, Nigerian writer, playwright and Nobel laureate
July 20 – Uwe Johnson, German writer (died 1984)
July 21 – Jonathan Miller, English satirist and non-fiction author (died 2019)
August 5 – Wendell Berry, American poet, novelist and activist (died 2019)
August 6
Piers Anthony, English-born science fiction and fantasy writer
Diane di Prima, American poet of the Beat Generation and artist (died 2020)
August 16 – Diana Wynne Jones, English children's fantasy novelist (died 2011)
September 11 – Leon Rooke, Canadian novelist
September 17 – Binoy Majumdar, Indian Hungryalist poet (died 2006)
September 21 – Leonard Cohen, Canadian-born poet, singer-songwriter and novelist (died 2016)
September 23 – Per Olov Enquist, Swedish novelist (died 2020)
October 1 – Shakeb Jalali, Pakistani poet in Urdu (suicide 1966)
October 17 – Alan Garner, English children's novelist
October 24 – Adrian Mitchell, English poet, playwright and children's author (died 2008)
November 9 – Ronald Harwood (Ronald Horwitz), South African-born English dramatist and screenwriter (died 2020)
November 12 – John McGahern, Irish novelist (died 2006)
November 15 – Irén Pavlics, Slovene author in Hungary
November 19 – Joanne Kyger, American poet (died 2017)
November 21 – Beryl Bainbridge, English novelist (died 2010)
December 5 – Joan Didion, American writer (died 2021)
December 28 – Alasdair Gray, Scottish novelist and artist (died 2019)unknown datesMuhammad al-Maghut, Syrian Ismaili poet (died 2006)
Yaakov Shabtai, Israeli novelist, playwright and translator (died 1981)

Deaths
January 1 – Jakob Wassermann, German-Jewish novelist (born 1873)
January 6 – Dorothy Edwards, Welsh novelist (suicide, born 1903)
January 8 – Andrei Bely (Boris Nikolaevich Bugaev), Russian novelist, poet and critic (born 1880)
January 11 – Helen Zimmern, German-born English writer and translator (born 1846)
January 15 – Hermann Bahr, Austrian dramatist and critic (born 1863)
February 8 – Ferenc Móra, Hungarian novelist and journalist (born 1879)
February 28 – Emeline Harriet Howe, American poet, writer and social activist (born 1844)
March 10 – Thomas Anstey Guthrie (F. Anstey), English comic novelist and journalist (born 1856)
April 9 – Safvet-beg Bašagić, Bosnian poet (born 1870)
April 12 – Robert Clyde Packer, Australian journalist and newspaper magnate (heart failure, born 1879)
May 1 – Paul Zarifopol, Romanian critic (born 1874)
June 14 – John Gray, English poet (born 1866)
June 21 – Thorne Smith, American humorist and fantasy author (heart attack, born 1892)
June 26 – Naito Torajiro (内藤 虎次郎), Japanese historian (born 1866)
June 30 – Night of the Long Knives
Fritz Gerlich, German journalist (murdered, born 1883)
Karl-Günther Heimsoth, Austrian doctor and gay publicist (shot, born 1899)
Willi Schmid, German music critic (murdered, born 1893)
July 4 – Hayim Nahman Bialik, Hebrew-language poet (born 1873)
July 21 – Julian Hawthorne, American journalist and novelist (born 1846)
July 23 – Karl Joel, German philosopher (born 1864)
July 29 – Frane Bulić, Croatian historian (born 1846)
August 13 – Mary Hunter Austin, American travel writer (born 1868)
August 30 – Rebecca Richardson Joslin, American non-fiction writer (born 1846)
September 9 – Roger Fry, English art critic (born 1866)
September 21 – Gheorghe Bogdan-Duică, Romanian literary critic (born 1866)
November 23 – Arthur Wing Pinero, English dramatist (born 1855)
December 15 – Gustave Lanson, French historian and literary critic (born 1857)
December 26 – Wallace Thurman, African American novelist (TB, born 1902)unknown datesCora Linn Danielsn, American author, editor, correspondent (born 1952)

Awards
James Tait Black Memorial Prize for fiction: Robert Graves, I, Claudius and Claudius the GodJames Tait Black Memorial Prize for biography: J. E. Neale, Queen ElizabethKing's Gold Medal for Poetry instituted this year with first winner, Laurence Whistler
Newbery Medal for children's literature: Cornelia Meigs, Invincible LouisaNobel Prize for literature: Luigi Pirandello.
Prix Goncourt: Roger Vercel, Capitaine ConanPulitzer Prize for Drama: Sidney Kingsley, Men in WhitePulitzer Prize for Poetry: Robert Hillyer, Collected VersePulitzer Prize for the Novel: Caroline Miller, Lamb in His Bosom''

References

 
Years of the 20th century in literature